Sesto San Giovanni railway station is a railway station in Italy. Located on the Milan–Chiasso railway, it serves the city of Sesto San Giovanni.

Services
Sesto San Giovanni is served by lines S7, S8, S9, and S11 of the Milan suburban railway service, and by the Milan–Carnate–Bergamo regional line, all operated by the Lombard railway company Trenord.

See also
 Milan suburban railway service

References

External links

Railway stations in Lombardy
Milan S Lines stations
Railway stations opened in 1969